Frédéric Pietruszka (born 13 May 1954) is a French fencer. He won a gold medal in the team foil event at the 1980 Summer Olympics and a bronze in the same events at the 1976 and 1984 Summer Olympics.

He was president of the French Fencing Federation from 2005 to 2012. He is currently general secretary of the International Fencing Federation.

References

External links
 

1954 births
Living people
French male foil fencers
Olympic fencers of France
Fencers at the 1976 Summer Olympics
Fencers at the 1980 Summer Olympics
Fencers at the 1984 Summer Olympics
Olympic gold medalists for France
Olympic bronze medalists for France
Olympic medalists in fencing
People from Villecresnes
Fencers from Paris
Medalists at the 1976 Summer Olympics
Medalists at the 1980 Summer Olympics
Medalists at the 1984 Summer Olympics
Sportspeople from Val-de-Marne